Mohammad Shadkam (born April 28, 1990) is an Iranian football striker, who plays for Naft Masjed Soleyman in the Persian Gulf Pro League.

Club career statistics

References

External links
 

1989 births
Living people
Iranian footballers
Association football defenders
Association football wingers
People from Tehran Province
Gol Gohar players
Sanat Naft Abadan F.C. players
Naft Masjed Soleyman F.C. players
F.C. Pars Jonoubi Jam players